Score is a live album and DVD by progressive metal band Dream Theater. It was recorded on April 1, 2006 at Radio City Music Hall in New York City. The concert was the last of their 20th Anniversary Tour, labeled "A Very Special Evening with Dream Theater".  The entire second half of the concert features a complete symphonic orchestra, dubbed "The Octavarium Orchestra", conducted by Jamshied Sharifi.

The album was released on August 29, 2006 and contains the entire concert setlist, including the encore. A condensed version of the concert was aired on VH1 Classic on August 25, 2006, 4 days before the release of the album and DVD. It was released on September 2, 2006 in Australia.

The title of the album comes from the word "score", meaning the number twenty, in reference to the band's 20th anniversary. It can also refer to a conductor's musical score, which is seen on the album cover.

Two of the songs recorded on this album were previously unreleased: "Another Won," a song written by the band in their earlier years, when they were known as Majesty; and "Raise the Knife", a song recorded for but omitted from Falling into Infinity.

In Australia, the three-disc version of the album was released on September 2, 2006.

Track listing

CD
All music composed by Dream Theater except where noted.

DVD
Tracks 1 through 8 feature Dream Theater alone. Tracks 9 through 14 feature Dream Theater and The Octavarium Orchestra.

Disc one
"The Root of All Evil" (from Octavarium) – 9:32
"I Walk Beside You" (from Octavarium) – 4:10
"Another Won" (from The Majesty Demos) – 5:40
"Afterlife" (from When Dream and Day Unite) – 7:28
"Under a Glass Moon" (from Images and Words) – 7:27
"Innocence Faded" (from Awake) – 6:16
"Raise the Knife" (unreleased track from the Falling into Infinity sessions) – 11:51
"The Spirit Carries On" (from Metropolis Pt. 2: Scenes from a Memory) – 9:37
"Six Degrees of Inner Turbulence" (from Six Degrees of Inner Turbulence) – 41:26
"Vacant" (from Train of Thought) – 3:03
"The Answer Lies Within" (from Octavarium) – 5:36
"Sacrificed Sons" (from Octavarium) – 10:36
"Octavarium" (from Octavarium) – 27:29
"Metropolis" (from Images and Words) – 11:16
Credits – 2:53

Disc two
"The Score So Far..." 20th Anniversary Documentary – 56:25
Octavarium Animation – 3:06
"Another Day" (Live in Tokyo – August 26, 1993) (from Images and Words) – 4:47
"The Great Debate" (Live in Bucharest – July 4, 2002) (from Six Degrees of Inner Turbulence) – 13:37
"Honor Thy Father" (Live in Chicago – August 12, 2005) (from Train of Thought) – 9:47

Personnel
 James LaBrie – Vocals
 John Myung – Bass
 John Petrucci – Guitar, backing vocals
 Mike Portnoy – Drums, backing vocals
 Jordan Rudess – Keyboards, Continuum, and Lap steel guitar

Octavarium Orchestra

Charts

Certifications

References

External links
Official site news update regarding the album

Dream Theater video albums
Dream Theater live albums
2006 live albums
Live video albums
2006 video albums
Rhino Entertainment live albums
Rhino Entertainment video albums
Albums recorded at Radio City Music Hall